Gardening for the Million is a book written by Alfred Pink. It was written for the English gardener. It briefly describes the characteristics of 1252 different plants that may be suitable for English gardens. The book was first published in London by Fisher Unwin in 1904 and is still available in print and in electronic editions. Each of the plants is now described in a Wikipedia article.

References
  (1904): Gardening for the Million. Fisher Unwin, London. TXT and HTML fulltexts at Project Gutenberg.

Botany handbooks and guides